Khunsari dialect is a Central dialect within the  Northwestern Iranian languages, spoken in Khansar, a town in the west of Isfahan Province of Iran. Some of the oldest isoglosses include the development of Aryan palatals to fricatives: OIr. *dz > z:  “big”,  “small”,  “yesterday”, - “know”,  “son-in-law” (but  “ugly” < SW *a-dushta-, cf. NPers.  < NW *a-zushta- “unloved”); *tsw > sp: ,  “dog” (< Median -),  “white”,  “louse”.

References

GEOGRAPHY OF THE MEDIAN DIALECTS OF ISFAHAN, Encyclopedia Iranica

Northwestern Iranian languages